Kotikawatta is a suburb of Colombo, Sri Lanka, situated east of the Colombo central business district. It is a fast developing administrative, commercial, and residential area in Colombo District.

See also
List of towns in Western Province, Sri Lanka

References

External links 
Detailed map of Kotikawatta by Maplandia

Populated places in Western Province, Sri Lanka